The International Space Olympics (ISO) is an annual two-week competition for teenagers aged from 14 to 18, held in Korolyov, Russia. The competition includes examinations in Mathematics, Physics, Computer Science, and English Literature, in addition to presentation of a space related research project.

On days when participants are not competing, they are given tours of some of Russia's top space facilities and areas of cultural significance, and even have a chance to videochat with astronauts and cosmonauts on the ISS. Participants come from a wide range of countries, with each country represented as a team. In previous years, teams have attended from Germany, Greece, Israel, United Kingdom, the United States, Kazakhstan, Australia, Spain and Russia. Overall, in 2012 there were 130 participating students, in 2013 and 2014 - over 200. Over the years, the International Space Olympics has been attended by over 1,850 Russian students, as well as more than 800 students from other countries.

The Olympics are held on the initiative of S. P. Korolyov Energia Space and Rocket Corporation and has an international status. The Opening Ceremony is usually started by the heads of Korolyov City, the Moscow region, municipal heads of education, pilots, cosmonauts and representatives from RSC Energia and MCC (mission control center in Korolyov).

Sometimes, in the media, the Space Olympics is referred to as an "international space olympics camp" for students or "an intellectual marathon". When in Russia, the competitors usually stay at a hostel, and at the end of the week they are taken to the country to sum up the whole event, to hold the award ceremony, to celebrate, and to have a "good-bye" party.

In 2014 China and Venezuela voiced their desire to participate in Space Olympic Games for the first time. Moreover, it is this year that freshmen and sophomores were considered for participation.

In the 2012 competition, Alex Gagliano won 1st place in Astrophysics presentations and Austin Chung won 1st place in Space History and Policy.

In the 2013 competition, Josh Ting won 1st place in Astrophysics and Hema Narlapati won 1st place in Space Policy.

References

Links 
 High Tech Seminars in Korolev
 
 

Science competitions